Sarcodontia fragilissima is a species of toothed crust fungus in the family Meruliaceae. The fungus was originally described as Hydnum fragilissimum by Miles Joseph Berkeley and Moses Ashley Curtis in 1873. It was transferred to the genus Sarcodontia by T.L. Nikolajeva in 1961.

References

Fungi described in 1873
Fungi of Europe
Meruliaceae
Taxa named by Miles Joseph Berkeley